There are several places called Brandy Hill:
Brandy Hill, South Wales, a hill
Brandy Hill, New South Wales, a residential area